Planet X is a bicycle company based in Rotherham, in the north of England. It was founded in 1988 by Dave Loughran and, in 2020, became an employee-owned trust.

Planet X operates a number of brands including On-One components and Titus bikes.

Production
Planet X works with Taiwanese, Chinese and Italian companies to manufacture its road, cyclocross, track and time-trial frames.

Retail
Planet X operates only online and has no retail stores.

Sponsorship
Planet X sponsored the world XTERRA Triathlon champion, Julie Dibens, during 2008 for a successful defence of her world title.

In 2003, Planet-X sponsored the Trialskings team who used Planet-X Pitbull and Jack Flash frames. These were present in Trialskings team videos, ridden by Danny Holroyd and other members.

References

External links 

Planet X

See also
Planet X (disambiguation)

Cycle manufacturers of the United Kingdom
Mountain bike manufacturers